The Zenith Data Systems Challenge Trophy was an association football tournament, labelled as an unofficial World Club Championship and sponsored by Zenith Data Systems, that was played in the summer of 1989 in Miami, Florida. Opponents were Arsenal F.C., the English champion, and the Argentinian champion, Independiente.

Arsenal became the unofficial World Champion after a difficult 2-1 win at Joe Robbie Stadium.  David Rocastle scored twice with the temporary equalizer by Carlos Alfaro Moreno for South-American players.

The Match 

Played at the Joe Robbie Stadium, Miami, Florida, U.S.A.
06-08-1989   Arsenal F.C. (GBR) – Independiente (ARG)   2-1
Att:                           10,042
Goals:                         David Rocastle, Alfaro Moreno, David Rocastle (penalty) 
Yellow cards:                  O'Leary, Dixon, Caesar (Arsenal), Delgado, Monzon, Altamirano (Independiente)
Red cards:                     Monzon (Independiente), Caesar, Lewin (Arsenal, physiotherapist)

References

External links 
 Has a physio ever been sent off ?.Guardian.co.uk.
 Out-of-sight Crowd Watches Arsenal Win First Zenith Cup.The Sun-Sentinel.
 The Game Is Soccer, Not Politics. The Sun-Sentinel.

Defunct international club association football competitions
Soccer in Florida